Wedgescale is a common name for several plants and may refer to:

Atriplex truncata, native to western North America
Sphenopholis